The Silver Tree is a 2006 album by Lisa Gerrard. It was her first solo album release since The Mirror Pool (1995). The album was initially released in digital format; followed by CD versions at the end of 2006, first in Australia by Rubber Records, followed by releases by Nettwerk in Europe, Sonic Records in Poland and Storm Creation in the United Kingdom. A U.S. release by Rubber in 2007 contained an extra track, "Entry".

The album was short-listed for the 2006 Australian Music Prize. It peaked at No. 4 on the Billboard New Age Albums chart.

Reception
Steve Hochman of the Los Angeles Times described it as "hypnotic, atmospheric", while AllMusic critic Thom Jurek praised the album, saying, "Gerrard's fans will find this irresistible, despite its lack of drama, and ambient music fans will no doubt appreciate its various textures, dimensions, and closely knit sonics. Yes, it is beautiful, and spiritual, and moving in places, but it is secretive, mysterious, and engaging on the aural level as a text as well.

Track listing
All compositions by Lisa Gerrard; except where noted.

Certain CD versions contain "Entry" as a bonus track 14

Personnel
 Composed and performed by Lisa Gerrard
 Engineered and produced by David Badrick and Lisa Gerrard (except "The Sea Whisperer" and "Serenity" engineered and produced by Michael Edwards and Lisa Gerrard)
 "In Exile" and "Tower" orchestrations by Patrick Cassidy
 Mastered by Don Tyler
 Art direction and design by Clive Collier

References 

2006 albums
Lisa Gerrard albums